Roman Valent (born 8 July 1983) is a professional tennis player from Switzerland. He was an outstanding junior, winning the 2001 Wimbledon Boys' Singles tournament. He has played in many Challenger and Futures tournaments, winning two of the latter. However, Valent has played just one match on the ATP Tour, in which he lost to Frenchman Marc Gicquel at the 2009 Open de Moselle.

Juniors
As a junior, Valent posted a singles record of 81–24 and reached as high as No. 3 in the world in 2001 (and No. 25 in doubles).

ATP Challenger and ITF Futures finals

Singles: 7 (2–5)

Doubles: 5 (2–3)

Junior Grand Slam finals

Singles: 1 (1 title)

References

External links
 
 

1983 births
Living people
People from Adliswil
Tennis players from Zürich
Swiss male tennis players
Wimbledon junior champions
Grand Slam (tennis) champions in boys' singles